Plagues is the second studio album by American metalcore band The Devil Wears Prada. It was released on August 21, 2007, through Rise Records and was re-released on October 28, 2008, with bonus content.

Background and promotion
The recording session for Plagues began during winter 2006 with Joey Sturgis as the chosen producer. The name of the album is a biblical reference to plagues in the book of Revelation. Mike Hranica, the vocalist, considered it to be "very visually appealing", although not as important as the meaning placed behind it. The recording was completed in spring 2007 and the album was released on August 21, 2007.

Plagues was re-released on October 28, 2008. The bonus content for the re-release includes an alternative cover, booklet art and a DVD which has footage of The Devil Wears Prada playing at Ultimatour and Warped Tour in 2008. It also includes the music videos for "Hey John, What's Your Name Again?" and "HTML Rulez D00d". Some of the pre-ordered versions of Plagues included a darker booklet that was signed by all the band members and a white disc, as opposed to the standard version which has a black disc and a lighter booklet.

The song "Hey John, What's Your Name Again?" is available as downloadable content for the Rock Band series of video games. The song "HTML Rulez D00d" is also available as downloadable content only for Rock Band 2 and Rock Band 3 via the Rock Band Network.

Composition
About.com referred to the album as incorporating "the usual metalcore style and constant breakdowns with synths and some rock elements that add a little twist to The Devil Wears Prada's sound."

Critical reception

The album has received mostly positive reviews since its release. Scott Fryberger of Jesus Freak Hideout said the song titles were "catchy, interesting, and sometimes funny" and praised the religious lyrics in "HTML Rulez D00d" and "Hey John, What's Your Name Again?" while also highlighting the self-loathing of "Reptar, King of the Ozone." Fryberger concluded his review by stating "the hardcore fan will find an album that was well worth their time, and an album they will want to listen to again and again."

A more mixed review came from AllMusic's Eduardo Rivadavia, who criticized the "silly song titles" used. Rivadavia compared the album to the band's debut, stating "the youthful sextet shifted a respectable amount of units with their first CD, 2006's Dear Love: A Beautiful Discord, and therefore saw no reason to tarry, nor alter their spastic screamo/metalcore formula while recording [their] sophomore outing" and "as a result, typical new offerings like 'Number Three, Never Forget' and 'Hey John, What's Your Name Again?' jostle the usual conflicting tendencies toward downtuned brutality and soaring harmonies, topped with alternately growled or clean-sung vocals to match each occasion -- but attempt nothing that TDWP influences like Norma Jean, Haste the Day, and the similarly synthesizer-addled Still Remains haven't already explored more extensively and effectively." Sputnikmusic also gave the album a mixed review, criticizing the heavy sections and Mike Hrancia's vocals for sounding like most other metalcore bands and being a poor attempt to capitalize on current trends. The review had slight praise for James Baney's keyboard sections along with the more melodic moments of the album.

Commercial performance
Plagues peaked at #57 on the Billboard 200 on September 8, 2007. The album has been a great success since its original release, selling 30,000 more copies than their first album, ''Dear Love: A Beautiful Discord.

Track listing

Personnel

The Devil Wears Prada
Daniel Williams - drums
Chris Rubey - lead guitar
Mike Hranica - unclean vocals
Jeremy DePoyster - rhythm guitar, clean vocals
Andy Trick - bass guitar
James Baney - keyboard, piano

Production
Joey Sturgis – engineering, mixing, mastering and production
Chris Rubey - layout and design
Dan Mumford - layout and design (re-release cover)
Eric Rushing - management
Additional musicians
Craig Owens of Chiodos
Cole Wallace of Gwen Stacy

References

2007 albums
The Devil Wears Prada (band) albums
Rise Records albums
Albums produced by Joey Sturgis